The 1932 Western State Teachers Hilltoppers football team was an American football team that represented Western State Teachers College (later renamed Western Michigan University) during the 1932 college football season. In their fourth season under head coach Mike Gary, the Hilltoppers compiled a 6–0–1 record, shut out six of seven opponents (including a scoreless tie with DePaul), and outscored all opponents by a combined total of 174 to 6. Tackle Trueman Pippel was the team captain.

Schedule

References

Western State Teachers
Western Michigan Broncos football seasons
College football undefeated seasons
Western State Teachers Hilltoppers football